Shahdali Sib Ali (also Romanized as Shahdālī Slb ʿAlī; also known as Shahdālī and Shahdālī-ye Soflá) is a village in Chin Rural District, Ludab District, Boyer-Ahmad County, Kohgiluyeh and Boyer-Ahmad Province, Iran. At the 2006 census, its population was 23, in 6 families.

References 

Populated places in Boyer-Ahmad County